Wilkin is a surname.

People of note with the surname Wilkin
 Abra Prentice Wilkin, American philanthropist
 Alexander Wilkin, American military officer
 Catherine Wilkin, Australian actress
 Catherine Wilkin, UK actor
 Jacob W. Wilkin, American judge
 Jeremy Wilkin, British actor
 John Wilkin, American librarian
 Jon Wilkin, British rugby player
 Karen Wilkin, American museum curator and art critic
 Marijohn Wilkin, American songwriter

Fictional persons
 Bingo Wilkin, character in That Wilkin Boy
 Wilbur Wilkin, character in Wilbur Comics

See also
Wilkins (surname)
Surnames from given names

References